Shubha Poonja is an Indian actress and former model. She has mostly appeared in Kannada films and Tamil. She is best known for her role in the movie Moggina Manasu for which she received Filmfare Award for Best Supporting Actress – Kannada. Recently she entered the Kannada TV reality show Bigg Boss Kannada (season 8).

Career
Shubha Poonja is of Mangalorean descent from the Tuluva community. She was raised in Bangalore and studied in Carmel Convent School, Jayanagar, Bangalore, before she started modelling, appearing in various television ads. Meanwhile, she won the "Miss Chennai-Top Model 2003" title. Subsequently, she entered the Tamil film industry, after K. S. Vasanthakumar, director of the Tamil film Machi approached her to enact the lead female role in the film, having seen her photos. After starring in the Tamil films Thirudiya Idhayathai and Shanmuga in the following months, she entered the Kannada film industry with the 2006 film Jackpot. Afterwards, she appeared in several Kannada films, including Chanda, Moggina Manasu and Slum Bala. Lately, she appeared in Anjadiru, the Kannada remake of the 2008 Tamil film Anjaathe, and in Thaakath.

Filmography

References

External links
 

Actresses from Mangalore
Indian film actresses
Living people
Actresses in Kannada cinema
Mangaloreans
Tulu people
Actresses in Tamil cinema
Filmfare Awards South winners
21st-century Indian actresses
Female models from Karnataka
Year of birth missing (living people)